William Evelyn may refer to:
 William Evelyn (priest) (died 1776), Dean of Emly in Ireland
 William Evelyn (British Army officer) (1723–1783), British Lieutenant–General
 William Evelyn (died 1813), Member of Parliament for Hythe
 William John Evelyn (1822–1908), Member of Parliament for West Surrey and Deptford
William Arthur Evelyn (1860–1935), historian of York